Between the Days is the second album by Australian singer Merril Bainbridge, released in Australia on 5 October 1998 (see 1998 in music) by Gotham Records. Bainbridge co-wrote most of the album with Owen Bolwell, who also produced the album with Siew and Sam Melamed. The album is a mix between alternative pop songs and features a cover of the Sonny & Cher song "I Got You Babe", sung with the Jamaican rapper Shaggy. The album produced Bainbridge's fifth top forty single on the ARIA Charts, and another top one hundred single.

Bainbridge started writing again when she was completing her first international tour. She states that title of the album "refers to a place I found myself when I was working on this album. I went through a period where I was very much secluded, and my only distractions were my vivid dreams which became a form of escapism". The album has the same sort of sound of her first album The Garden, but is more mature and centered.

Reception 

The album debuted on the Australian Albums Chart on 12 October 1998 at number fifty-eight, not as successful as The Garden which debuted at number five. It then dropped thirty-seven places to ninety-five. The album spent its last week in the chart at number ninety-four with a total of five weeks in the charts. In the U.S. the album was released six months after "Lonely" and did not have much promotion so it failed to chart on the Billboard 200.

The singles released from Between the Days were unsuccessful in most music markets. "Lonely" was the first song released from the album and was not a huge hit only peaking at number forty in Australia but was quite successful in Japan where it peaked at number twenty-five. "Lonely" was Bainbridge's third song eligible to chart in the U.S. but failed to crack the Billboard Hot 100 where it peaked at number eighteen on the Bubbling Under Hot 100 Singles Chart. "I Got You Babe" the second song released and is a cover of a Sonny & Cher song was not her most successful song only peaking at number sixty-two in Australia. "Between the Days" and "Walk on Fire" were also released as singles but failed to chart.

Track listing 
 "Between the Days" (Bainbridge, Owen Bolwell) – 3:40
 "Lonely" (Bainbridge, Bolwell) – 3:34
 "Goodbye to Day" (Bainbridge) – 4:04
 "Stars Collide" (Bainbridge, Bolwell) – 4:19
 "Walk on Fire" (Bainbridge, Bolwell) – 3:57
 "Hello" (Bainbridge, Bolwell) – 4:02
 "Blindfolded" (Bainbridge, Bolwell) – 4:38
 "Love and Terror" (Bainbridge, Bolwell) – 3:54
 "Call My Name" (Bainbridge, Bolwell) – 4:48
 "Big Machine" (Bainbridge, Bolwell) – 4:10

Australian edition
"I Got U Babe" (Sonny Bono) – 3:22

Personnel 
 Aaronski – studio assistant
 Elvis Aljus – percussion (track 9)
 Merril Bainbridge – background vocals (tracks 1—3, 5—11)
 Alastair Barden – drums (tracks 7 and 9)
 Mark Domoney – acoustic guitar (tracks 2, 4, 9, 10)
 Karen Eden – background vocals (track 4)
 Tony Espie – mixing (tracks 1—11)
 Daniela Federici – photography
 Stuart Fraser – guitar (track 7)
 Dion Hirini – acoustic guitar (track 7)
 Mark Ingram – engineer (tracks 1—11)
 Warren Jenkins – bass (tracks 1, 4, 5, 7—10)
 Anne McCue – acoustic guitar (tracks 5 and 7)
 Roger McLachlan – bass (tracks 2 and 6)
 Greg O'Connor – artwork
 Alex Pertout – percussion (track 4)
 Siew – producer (tracks 1—11)
 Gota Yashiki – percussion (track 5), loops (tracks 3 and 8)
 Leon Zervos – mastering

Japan edition
"I Got You Babe" – 3:22
"Lonely" (acoustic version) – 2:19

Singles

Charts

Release history

References 

1998 albums
Gotham Records albums
Merril Bainbridge albums
Universal Records albums